Barrault is a French patronymic surname. Notable people with the name include:

 Alexis Barrault (1812–1865), French engineer
 Doug Barrault (born 1970), Canadian ice hockey player
 François Barrault (born 1960), French businessman
 Jean-Louis Barrault (1910–1994), French actor, theatre director, and mime artist
 Marie-Christine Barrault (born 1944), French actress

See also
 Barraud
 Barre (name)
 Barreau
 Barriere

French-language surnames
Patronymic surnames